The MG 131 (shortened from German: Maschinengewehr 131, or "machine gun 131") was a German 13 mm caliber machine gun developed in 1938 by Rheinmetall-Borsig and produced from 1940 to 1945. The MG 131 was designed for use at fixed, flexible or turreted, single or twin mountings in Luftwaffe aircraft during World War II.

It was one of the smallest, if not the smallest, among the heavy machine guns of that conflict, with a weight of 16.6 kilograms (37 lb,) less than 60% of the M2 Browning or the Breda-SAFAT machine gun. Despite this, the MG 131 was a rapid fire weapon with an elevated firepower for its mass. It was equipped with HEI ammunition. Its nearest contemporary equivalent may have been the Japanese Ho-103, itself based on the earlier American M1921 Browning machine gun. The other main Axis automatic weapon of similar caliber, the Italian Breda 12.7 mm was around 13 kg heavier and bigger, while slower by at least 150 rpm. This small size allowed them to be mounted in the restricted space available in the nose of Luftwaffe fighters, originally designed to house the lighter caliber 7.92 mm machine guns.  This became the common configuration from 1943 onwards, as the increasing armour protection of most Allied aircraft, and the burgeoning challenge of daylight raids by heavy American bombers as the war progressed rendered the smaller caliber guns obsolescent in this role.

Lower ballistic properties that were still adequate for the task were obviously seen as an advantage: the gun was very accurate (35 x 45 cm spread at 100 m), and the barrel wore out much less quickly (barrel life of the MG 131 was 17,000 rounds), which meant that ballistic properties deteriorated more slowly.

It was installed in the Messerschmitt Bf 109, Me 410 Hornisse, Fw 190, Ju 88, Junkers Ju 388, He 177 Greif bomber variants, and many other aircraft.  The Fernbedienbare Drehlafette FDL 131Z remotely-controlled gun turret system, used either a single, or more commonly a "twinned" pair of MG 131s for dorsal defense. The quadmount Hecklafette HL 131V weapons "system" for tail defense, placing two MG 131 guns apiece in a pair of rotating, side-mount exterior elevation carriages (the manned turret "core" provided the traverse function), was meant for standardization on many late-war prototype developments of German heavy bomber airframes, but never came to fruition beyond a small number of dimensional prototype mockups and kinetic test units.

The MG 131 fired electrically primed ammunition in order to sustain a high rate of fire when shooting through the propeller disc of a single-engined fighter. A pair of MG 131 machine guns was used as cowl armament on later models of the Bf 109G (which originally required one blister or Beule on each side of the fuselage, flanking the upper rear end of the engine, to house the larger breech of the new gun) and the Fw 190.

Technical data

Weight : 
Length : 
Muzzle velocity : ~ 
Rate of fire : 900 rpm AP-API ; 930 rpm HEF-HEFI-I
Acccuracy : 35 x 45 cm spread at 100 m
Barrel Life : 17,000 rounds

Ammunition specifications
The MG 131 is the sole user of the electrically-primed 13×64mm B cartridge. A mechanically-primed variant was produced in small quantities in Spain for unknown uses.

See also
List of common World War II infantry weapons
List of firearms
M2 Browning machine gun

References

External links
Municion.org query for 13 x 64 ammunition (for more types with images and markings)
Image
http://www.lexikon-der-wehrmacht.de/Waffen/Bilderseiten/bordwaffen-R.htm

https://web.archive.org/web/20071130005600/http://library.thinkquest.org/C006001/armament/mg131.html
https://web.archive.org/web/20091027135418/http://geocities.com/Augusta/8172/panzerfaust5.htm

Aircraft guns
Heavy machine guns
Machine guns of Germany
World War II machine guns
Rheinmetall
Weapons and ammunition introduced in 1940